Leonard Craske (19 September 1880 – 29 August 1950) was a sculptor.

Craske was born and raised in London.  After emigrating to the United States and settling in Boston, he became an accomplished sculptor, creating the well-known Gloucester Fisherman's Memorial in Gloucester, Massachusetts, the work for which he is best remembered. His work was part of the sculpture event in the art competition at the 1932 Summer Olympics.

References

1880 births
1950 deaths
Artists from London
English emigrants to the United States
Olympic competitors in art competitions
20th-century American sculptors
American male sculptors
20th-century American male artists